Bani Walid is a sub-district located in Al Haymah Al Kharijiyah District, Sana'a Governorate, Yemen. Bani Walid had a population of 1846 according to the 2004 census.

References 

Sub-districts in Al Haymah Al Kharijiyah District